Madhavnagar Road railway station is a small railway station in Katni district, Madhya Pradesh. Its code is MDRR. It serves Madhavnagar city. The station consists of two platforms, neither well sheltered. It lacks many facilities including water and sanitation.

References

Railway stations in Katni district
Jabalpur railway division